The Key School is an independent coeducational school, located in the neighborhood of Hillsmere Shores in Annapolis, Maryland. The Key School was established by a group of tutors from St. John's College in 1958. Key is a member of the National Association of Independent Schools (NAIS).

Notable faculty

 Ivan Leshinsky (born 1947), American-Israeli basketball player

Notable alumni
 Tim White and Trevor White, filmmakers

Notes

References

External links
 

Private elementary schools in Maryland
Private middle schools in Maryland
Private high schools in Maryland
Schools in Anne Arundel County, Maryland
Buildings and structures in Annapolis, Maryland
Preparatory schools in Maryland
Educational institutions established in 1958
1958 establishments in Maryland